Sudhirbhai Vaghani is an Indian politician. He is a Member of the Gujarat Legislative Assembly from the Gariadhar Assembly constituency representing the Aam Aadmi Party since December 8, 2022.

References 

Living people
Aam Aadmi Party politicians
Year of birth missing (living people)